João Luís Gouveia Martins (born 24 April 1967) is a Portuguese football coach and former player. A defender during his playing days, he is currently without a club.

Playing career
Martins spent his whole playing career as a defender, playing mostly with Portuguese club Marítimo. He made his European debut in the 1993–94 UEFA Cup, in Marítimo's 2-0 defeat against Royal Antwerp.

Managerial career
Martins started his managerial career with GR Cruzado Canicense before spending three seasons as the manager of Marítimo B. He then spent four years as an assistant manager, including spells in Qatar with Al Ahli and in Saudi Arabia with Al-Qadsiah, before returning to manage Marítimo B in 2015. Martins was an assistant manager for Lithuanian club FC Stumbras for three years before spending a few months as their manager. In 2020, he became the manager of Lithuanian team FK Panevėžys.

Honours

Player

Marítimo
Taça de Portugal: 1994-95 (runner-up)

Manager

Panevėžys
Lithuanian Football Cup: 2020

References

1967 births
Living people
Portuguese footballers
Portuguese football managers
Sportspeople from Funchal
Association football defenders
C.S. Marítimo players
Primeira Liga players
Segunda Divisão players
FC Stumbras managers
FK Žalgiris managers
A Lyga managers
Portuguese expatriate football managers
Expatriate football managers in Angola
Portuguese expatriate sportspeople in Angola
Expatriate football managers in Qatar
Portuguese expatriate sportspeople in Qatar
Expatriate football managers in Saudi Arabia
Portuguese expatriate sportspeople in Saudi Arabia
Expatriate football managers in Lithuania
Portuguese expatriate sportspeople in Lithuania